Mordechai Tokarsky is an educator and community activist in New York. He was born in the former Soviet Union and is one was one of the first Jewish educators from the former Soviet Union to be educated in the US. In 2006, he help found Russian American Jewish Experience, a community group in Brighton Beach, Brooklyn, and is currently the National Director of the organization.

References

Jewish activists
Living people
Year of birth missing (living people)